Tom Fitzpatrick (birth unknown – death unknown) was an Australian rugby league footballer who played 75 games and scored 24 tries for Eastern Suburbs between 1924-1930..

References

Australian rugby league players
Year of birth missing
Year of death missing
Place of death missing
Rugby league second-rows
Rugby league props
Sydney Roosters players
Place of birth missing